In Southern France, a viguerie was a mediaeval administrative court. A viguerie is named for the place it serves or is found in, that is, the main town of the borough, which need not be its  (administrative capital).

Appearing during the Carolingian dynasty, the  started as the seat of civil and criminal justice, taking its name from the Count or Viscount. With the decline of feudal power and its transfer to Royal jurisdiction, the  became the lowest court, dealing only with day-to-day affairs.

 largely disappeared after 1749, following an edict suppressing the lower courts. Even so, in many regions such as Provence, they survived until the French Revolution. In Languedoc, Rouergue and Carladés, they transformed into the lowest Courts of Appeal.

In other regions similar courts were named for the title of the title or rank of the person who held responsibility for them, such as châtellenie (administered by a châtelain), prévôté (under a prévôt), vicomté (under a viscount), and a bailie or baillage or sénéchaussée (administered by a baliff).

See also 
 Magistrate, a minor lawyer in the United Kingdom
 Vicar, one who administers religious law
 Vegueria, in Catalonia
 Ancien Régime in France (section Justice)

Legal history of the Ancien Régime